Podocarpus teysmannii is a species of conifer in the family Podocarpaceae. It is found in Indonesia and Malaysia.

References

teysmannii
Least concern plants
Taxonomy articles created by Polbot